Ludwik Narbutt (26 August 1832 - 5 May 1863) was a Lithuanian noble and a notable military commander during the January Uprising. Son of Teodor Narbutt, he led a large unit of Polish insurgents in the region of the town of Lida, from the start of the uprising till his death in combat on 5 May 1863.

Further reading 
 Paweł Komorowski, Aleksander Kołyszko,  Ludwik Narbutt - Z dziejów historycznej świadomości Polaków na Ziemi Lidzkiej , Wydawnictwo Retro-Art, Warszawa-Lida 1999

References

External links 
  Ludwik Narbutt - bohater narodowy 
  W rocznicę Powstania Styczniowego Za naszą wolność i waszą
  Mogiła Narbutta

1832 births
1863 deaths
People from Voranava District
People from Lidsky Uyezd
19th-century Polish nobility
Clan of Trąby
January Uprising participants
Recipients of the Order of St. Anna
19th-century Polish military personnel